Ludwig Manuel Ortiz Flores (born February 23, 1976) is a male judoka from Venezuela, who twice won the silver medal in the men's half lightweight division (– 66 kg) at the Pan American Games (1999 and 2003). He represented his native country in three consecutive Summer Olympics, starting in 2000.

External links
 
 
 
 

1976 births
Living people
Venezuelan male judoka
Judoka at the 2000 Summer Olympics
Judoka at the 2004 Summer Olympics
Judoka at the 2008 Summer Olympics
Judoka at the 1999 Pan American Games
Judoka at the 2003 Pan American Games
Judoka at the 2007 Pan American Games
Olympic judoka of Venezuela
Pan American Games silver medalists for Venezuela
Pan American Games bronze medalists for Venezuela
Pan American Games medalists in judo
South American Games bronze medalists for Venezuela
South American Games medalists in judo
Competitors at the 2006 South American Games
Medalists at the 1999 Pan American Games
Medalists at the 2003 Pan American Games
Medalists at the 2007 Pan American Games
20th-century Venezuelan people
21st-century Venezuelan people